China competed at the 2012 Summer Paralympics in London, United Kingdom, from 29 August to 9 September 2012.

Medalists

Gold medalists

Silver medalists

Bronze medalists

Multiple medalists

Archery 

Men

|-
|align=left|Dong Zhi
|align=left rowspan=2|Individual recurve standing
|627
|4
|
| (13) L 5-6
|colspan=4|Did not advance
|-
|align=left|Li Zongshan
|605
|10
| (23) L 4-6
|colspan=5|Did not advance
|-
|align=left|Cheng Changjie
|align=left|Individual recurve W1/W2
|626
|3
|
| (19) L 5-6
|colspan=4|Did not advance
|-
|align=left|Cheng ChangjieDong ZhiLi Zongshan
|align=left|Team recurve
|1858
|3
|
|
| (6) W 194-185
| (2) L 207-214
| (1) W 206-193
|
|}

Women

|-
|align=left|Gao Fangxia
|align=left rowspan=2|Individual recurve standing
|581
|1
|
| (17) W 6-0
| (8) L 0-6
|colspan=3|Did not advance
|-
|align=left|Yan Huilian
|573
|3
|
| (19) W 6-4
| (6) W 6-0
| (2) W 6-2
| (4) W 6-4
|
|-
|align=left|Xiao Yanhong
|align=left rowspan=2|Individual recurve W1/W2
|560
|3
|
| (14) L 2-6
|colspan=4|Did not advance
|-
|align=left|Li Jinzhi
|522
|11
|
| (6) W 6-4
| (14) W 6-5
| (2) L 4-6
| (12) W 6-4
|
|-
|align=left|Xiao YanhongGao FangxiaYan Huilian
|align=left|Team recurve
|1714
|1
|colspan=2 
|
| (4) W 192-188
| (4) L 193-199
|
|}

Athletics

T/F11-13

Men's Track

Men's Field

Women's Track

Women's Field

T/F31-38

Men's Track

Men's Field

Women's Track

Women's Field

F40

Men's Field

Women's Field

T/F42-46

Men's track and road event

Men's field

Women's track event

Women's field

T/F51-58

Men's track and road event

Men's field event

Women's track event

Women's field event

Boccia 

Individual

Teams

Cycling

Road

Men

Women

Track

Time Trial

Individual Pursuit

Team sprint

Football 5-a-side

China has qualified for the football 5-a-side tournament.

Group play

5th–8th place semi-finals

5th–6th place match

Goalball

Men's tournament

Roster

Daolei Bao
Changgui Cai
Liangliang Chen
Jinran Du
Shuai Shao
Yongquan Yao

Group B

Quarter-final

Women's tournament

Roster

Fengqing Chen
Feifei Fan
Zhen Ju
Lin Shan
Ruixue Wang
Shasha Wang

Group C

Quarter-final

Semi-final

Final

Judo

Powerlifting 

Men

Women

Rowing

Shooting

Swimming

Men

Women

Table tennis 

Men's individual

Men's team

Women's individual

Women's team

Volleyball

Men's tournament

Roster

Group B

Quarter-final

5th–8th place semi-final

7th/8th place match

Women's tournament
Roster

Group B

Semi-final

Gold medal match

Wheelchair basketball

Women's tournament

Roster

Qiurong Chen
Haizhen Cheng
Mingzhu Deng
Yongqing Fu

Yanhua Li
Yuhui Li
Man Liu
Yun Long

Fengling Peng
Xiaoyan Wang
San Yang
Yanli Zhang

Group B

Quarter-final

5th–8th place semi-final

5th/6th place match

Wheelchair fencing 

Men

Women

See also
2012 Summer Paralympics
China at the Paralympics
China at the 2012 Summer Olympics

Notes

External links
Roster of Chinese delegates at the 2012 Summer Paralympics (Chinese)

Nations at the 2012 Summer Paralympics
2012
Paralympics